The 1st Air Command (Serbo-Croatian: 1. vazduhoplovna komanda/ 1.  ваздухопловна команда) was a joint unit of the Yugoslav Air Force from 1959 to 1964, serving as the premier air force unit within Yugoslavia. The unit served during a time of uncertainty for the Yugoslav Air Force, in which internal and external forces put political pressure upon the force. This included the utilization of NATO and Soviet aircraft, and the eventual dissolution of the 1st Air Command in 1964.

History
It was established by the order on 27 June, 1959  due to the "Drvar" reorganization plan of Yugoslav Air Force from the 44th Aviation Division with command at Batajnica. In 1961, it suffered a change in the organization.

On 2 May, 1964, due to the new "Drvar 2" reorganization plan of the Yugoslav Air Force, the 1st Air Command was transformed into the 1st Aviation Corps.

Its commander was Nikola Lekić.

Organization

1959-1961
1st Air Command
112th Signal Battalion
Liaison Squadron of 1st Air Command
Light Combat Aviation Squadron of 1st Air Command
1st Air Reconnaissance Regiment
88th Fighter-Bomber Aviation Regiment
204th Fighter-Bomber Aviation Regiment
119th Transport Aviation Regiment
103rd Reconnaissance Aviation Regiment
177th Air Base
191st Air Base

1961-1964
1st Air Command
112th Signal Battalion
460th Light Combat Aviation Squadron
1st Air Reconnaissance Regiment
204th Fighter-Bomber Aviation Regiment
88th Fighter-Bomber Aviation Regiment
119th Support Aviation Regiment
177th Air Base
191st Air Base

Headquarters
Batajnica

Commanding officers 
Colonel Nikola Lekić

References 
Notes and citations

Bibliography
 

Air Commands of Yugoslav Air Force
Military units and formations established in 1959